The arrondissement of Fontenay-le-Comte is an arrondissement of France in the Vendée department in the Pays de la Loire region. It has 108 communes.

Composition

The communes of the arrondissement of Fontenay-le-Comte, and their INSEE codes, are:

 L'Aiguillon-la-Presqu'île (partly)(85001)
 Antigny (85005)
 Auchay-sur-Vendée (85009)
 Bazoges-en-Pareds (85014)
 Benet (85020)
 Bessay (85023)
 Bouillé-Courdault (85028)
 Le Boupère (85031)
 Bourneau (85033)
 La Bretonnière-la-Claye (85036)
 La Caillère-Saint-Hilaire (85040)
 Cezais (85041)
 Chaillé-les-Marais (85042)
 Champagné-les-Marais (85049)
 La Chapelle-Thémer (85056)
 Chasnais (85058)
 La Châtaigneraie (85059)
 Château-Guibert (85061)
 Chavagnes-les-Redoux (85066)
 Cheffois (85067)
 Corpe (85073)
 La Couture (85074)
 Damvix (85078)
 Doix-lès-Fontaines (85080)
 Faymoreau (85087)
 Fontenay-le-Comte (85092)
 Foussais-Payré (85094)
 Grues (85104)
 Le Gué-de-Velluire (85105)
 L'Hermenault (85110)
 L'Île-d'Elle (85111)
 La Jaudonnière (85115)
 Lairoux (85117)
 Le Langon (85121)
 Liez (85123)
 Loge-Fougereuse (85125)
 Longèves (85126)
 Luçon (85128)
 Les Magnils-Reigniers (85131)
 Maillé (85132)
 Maillezais (85133)
 Mareuil-sur-Lay-Dissais (85135)
 Marillet (85136)
 Marsais-Sainte-Radégonde (85137)
 Le Mazeau (85139)
 La Meilleraie-Tillay (85140)
 Menomblet (85141)
 Mervent (85143)
 Monsireigne (85145)
 Montournais (85147)
 Montreuil (85148)
 Moreilles (85149)
 Mouilleron-Saint-Germain (85154)
 Moutiers-sur-le-Lay (85157)
 Mouzeuil-Saint-Martin (85158)
 Nalliers (85159)
 L'Orbrie (85167)
 Péault (85171)
 Petosse (85174)
 Les Pineaux (85175)
 Pissotte (85176)
 Pouillé (85181)
 Pouzauges (85182)
 Puy-de-Serre (85184)
 Puyravault (85185)
 Réaumur (85187)
 La Réorthe (85188)
 Rives-d'Autise (85162)
 Rosnay (85193)
 Saint-Aubin-la-Plaine (85199)
 Saint-Cyr-des-Gâts (85205)
 Saint-Denis-du-Payré (85207)
 Sainte-Gemme-la-Plaine (85216)
 Sainte-Hermine (85223)
 Sainte-Pexine (85261)
 Sainte-Radégonde-des-Noyers (85267)
 Saint-Étienne-de-Brillouet (85209)
 Saint-Hilaire-des-Loges (85227)
 Saint-Hilaire-de-Voust (85229)
 Saint-Jean-de-Beugné (85233)
 Saint-Juire-Champgillon (85235)
 Saint-Laurent-de-la-Salle (85237)
 Saint-Martin-de-Fraigneau (85244)
 Saint-Martin-des-Fontaines (85245)
 Saint-Martin-Lars-en-Sainte-Hermine (85248)
 Saint-Maurice-des-Noues (85251)
 Saint-Maurice-le-Girard (85252)
 Saint-Mesmin (85254)
 Saint-Michel-en-l'Herm (85255)
 Saint-Michel-le-Cloucq (85256)
 Saint-Pierre-du-Chemin (85264)
 Saint-Pierre-le-Vieux (85265)
 Saint-Sigismond (85269)
 Saint-Sulpice-en-Pareds (85271)
 Saint-Valérien (85274)
 Sérigné (85281)
 Sèvremont (85090)
 La Taillée (85286)
 Tallud-Sainte-Gemme (85287)
 Terval (85289)
 Thiré (85290)
 Thouarsais-Bouildroux (85292)
 Triaize (85297)
 Les Velluire-sur-Vendée (85177)
 Vix (85303)
 Vouillé-les-Marais (85304)
 Vouvant (85305)
 Xanton-Chassenon (85306)

History

The arrondissement of Fontenay-le-Comte was created in 1811. At the January 2017 reorganisation of the arrondissements of Vendée, it received 11 communes from the arrondissement of La Roche-sur-Yon.

As a result of the reorganisation of the cantons of France which came into effect in 2015, the borders of the cantons are no longer related to the borders of the arrondissements. The cantons of the arrondissement of La Roche-sur-Yon were, as of January 2015:

 Chaillé-les-Marais
 La Châtaigneraie
 Fontenay-le-Comte
 L'Hermenault
 Luçon
 Maillezais
 Pouzauges
 Sainte-Hermine
 Saint-Hilaire-des-Loges

Sub-prefects 
 Pierre-Henry Maccioni : 1970-1972

References

Fontenay-le-Comte